Anthony Newman (born May 12, 1941) is an American classical musician. While mostly known as an organist, Newman is also a harpsichordist, pedal harpsichordist, pianist, fortepianist, composer, conductor, writer, and teacher. A specialist in music of the Baroque period, particularly the works of Johann Sebastian Bach, Newman considers himself to have played an important role in the movement towards historically informed performance. He has collaborated with noted musicians such as Kathleen Battle, Julius Baker, Itzhak Perlman, Eugenia Zukerman, Jean-Pierre Rampal, Leonard Bernstein, Michala Petri and Wynton Marsalis for whom he arranged and conducted In Gabriel’s Garden, the most popular classical record of 1996.

Early life
Newman was born in Los Angeles, California. His father was a lawyer, and his mother was a professional dancer and an amateur pianist. Newman started playing the piano by ear at age four and could read music before he could read words. He was five when he first heard the music of J.S. Bach (the fifth Brandenburg Concerto) and was "delighted, elated and fascinated." At five he began piano lessons but decided to add organ after hearing his first Bach organ music (Toccata and Fugue in D minor). He had to wait until he was ten to begin organ lessons because before then his feet would not reach the pedals. From the age of ten to seventeen he studied the organ with Richard Keys Biggs.

At age seventeen Newman went to Paris, France, to study at l'École Normale de Musique. His primary teachers were Pierre Cochereau (organ), Madeleine de Valmalete (piano), and Marguerite Roesgen-Champion (harpsichord). He received a diplôme supérieur, with the commendations of the legendary pianist Alfred Cortot.

Newman returned to the United States and received a B.S. in 1963 from the Mannes School of Music having studied organ with Edgar Hilliar, piano with Edith Oppens and composition with William Sydemann. He worked as a teaching fellow at Boston University while studying composition with Leon Kirchner at Harvard University. He received his M.A. in composition from Harvard in 1966 and his doctorate in organ from Boston University in 1967 where he studied organ with George Faxon and composition with Gardner Read and Luciano Berio for whom he also served as teaching assistant.

Professional life

Newman's professional debut, in which he played Bach organ works on the pedal harpsichord, took place at the Carnegie Recital Hall in New York in 1967. Of this performance The New York Times wrote, "His driving rhythms and formidable technical mastery...and intellectually cool understanding of the structures moved his audience to cheers at the endings." Based solely on the Times’ review, and without an audition, Columbia Records signed Newman to a recording contract. Clive Davis, head of Columbia Records, took his cue from the prevailing anti-establishment sentiment among young people and Newman's long hair and interest in Zen meditation and marketed Newman as a counterculture champion of Bach would could draw young audiences. As a result, according to Newman, it took some years for him to "live down" the image created by Davis and to be taken seriously in the classical music world. But Newman did indeed draw young audiences as noted by Time magazine in a 1971 article in which they dubbed him the "high priest of the harpsichord." After recording twelve albums for Columbia Records Newman left along with pianist André Watts, another of Davis' protégés, when Davis left Columbia in 1979. Newman has gone on to make solo recordings for a variety of labels including Digitech, Excelsior, Helicon, Infinity Digital/Sony, Moss Music Group/Vox, Newport Classic, Second Hearing, Sheffield, Sine Qua Non, Sony, Deutsch Grammophon, and 903 Records. Newman has recorded most of Bach's keyboard works on organ, harpsichord and piano as well as recording works of Scarlatti, Handel, and Couperin. On the fortepiano he has recorded the works of Beethoven and Mozart. As a conductor Newman has led international orchestras such as the Madeira Festival Orchestra, the Brandenburg Collegium, and the English Chamber Orchestra.

For thirty years, starting in 1968, while Newman continued to record, concertize, compose, conduct and write, he taught music at The Juilliard School, Indiana University, and State University of New York at Purchase.

Although initially intensely interested in composition, he became discouraged by the non-tonal music that was the focus of conservatory composition departments in the 1950s and '60s. He returned to composition in the 1980s and developed a post-modern compositional style that took over from where pre-atonal post-modernism left off. He makes use of musical archetypes from the 17th, 18th, and 19th centuries as well as 20th century archetypes he has devised himself with the intent making new but accessible music. Newman has written music for a range of instruments including organ, harpsichord, orchestra, guitar, violin, cello, flute chamber ensemble, piano, choral music and opera. In 2011, Newman released a 20-CD set of his most important compositions on 903 Records.

Newman is music director of Bach Works and Bedford Chamber Concerts and is on the board of Musical Quarterly magazine. He is also music director at St. Matthews Church, Bedford New York.

Baroque performance controversy
From the beginning Newman's interpretation of the music of J.S. Bach brought disdain from many musicians. His chosen tempos are generally extremely fast, and he often takes liberties with rhythm and ornamentation. Newman's argument in favor of his tempo is that what he calls the "traditional" approach to Bach began 100 years after Bach's death and is misguided by a mystique and reverence for the composer that results in performances which are slow, rhythmically restrained and without the vivification of ornamentation. In contrast, Newman's recordings of Bach have been considered "exciting" by some who are skeptical of the validity of his interpretations.  In Newman's scholarly text, Bach and the Baroque, published in 1985 and revised in 1995, Newman supports his performance of Baroque music with a thorough analysis based on contemporary 17th and 18th century sources. Newman discusses how alterations to the written music - rhythmic variations such as rubato and notes inégales as well as improvised ornamentation - were common in Bach's time and that fast movements were played faster than has been traditionally accepted. Scholarly opposition to Newman's approach was led by Frederick Neumann who had long-held that notes inégales were limited primarily to French performance practice and that Bach, who traveled relatively little, would not have been exposed to this technique. In reviewing Newman's Bach and the Baroque in 1987 Neumann was at first somewhat gracious calling Newman "...a splendid keyboard performer who can dazzle his audiences with brilliant virtuosic feats. He can, and often does, play faster than perhaps any of his colleagues, and shows occasionally other signs of eccentricity." However he takes Newman to task for "careless scholarship" citing misuse of terms such as tactus and misinterpretation of Bach's notation. But his strongest objection is to Newman's defense of the use of notes inégales in the performance of Bach. Most of Neumann's complaints question the validity of Newman's sources.

Music critics too have been of two minds about Newman's interpretations of Bach, as illustrated in the following excerpts from The New York Times:

"A hiccup effect, or a sudden pause…is it rubato or something else that Mr. Newman applies…whatever it is, it lurches absurdly."
"His use of rubato as a structural device is particularly subtle – tiny pauses at various key spots to isolate and define vertical blocks within a phrase"
"…his accents…startle, even outrage…it is like listening to someone who speaks your native language with breathtaking fluency but in a thick accent, sprinkled with outrageous mispronunciations."
"His free use of rhythm to define larger phrase structures…does serve its purpose admirably in addition to adding a touch of drama to his performances."

Over time Newman's fast tempos have become relatively common in the performance of Bach's works and his championing of the use of original instruments foreshadowed the historically informed performance movement in America by at least ten years.

Personal life
At the age of 28, Newman became a student of Zen Buddhism and has practiced meditation several hours a day since then. Newman was a volunteer at the hospice unit of Stamford Hospital from 1995 to 2004. He is married to Rabbi Mary Jane Newman. They have three sons.

Discography
Note: * indicates Newman's composition

903 Records
J.S. Bach: Six Partitas
J.S. Bach: Well Tempered Clavier Book 2, 1742
J.S. Bach: Works for Pedal Harpsichord and Organ, 230
J.S. Bach: Inventions in 2 Parts and Sinfonias in 3 Parts
J.S. Bach: Great Works for Organ, 114
The Music of J.S. Bach, 552
J.S. Bach: French Suites, 30 Variations on Walsingham, 1722
J.S. Bach: Six Partitas, 599
J.S. Bach: English Suites, 1723
My Favorite Bach Recordings, 2013
J.S. Bach: Aria with 30 Variations
Selections from Bach's Brandenburg Concerti
J.S. Bach: Concerto in D Minor, Seven Toccatas for Harpsichord
The Complete Collected Harpsichord Works of J.S. Bach
The Complete Collected Organ Works of J.S. Bach
Ad Nos, Ad Salutaremudam & Fantasia and Fugue on BACH, Music of Franz Liszt
3 Great Piano Duets
Three Symphonies for Organ Solo *, 240
Nicole and the Trial of the Century *, 1994
Complete Works for Cello and Piano *, 121
Complete Works for Violin and Piano *, 253
Te Deum Laudamus *, 2007
Large Chamber Works: Chamber Concerto, String Quartet #2, Piano Quintet *
Complete Works for Organ *, 17501941, 2016 
American Classic Symphonies 1 and 2 *, 200
Ittzes Plays Newman: Complete Works for Flute *, 309
12 Preludes and Fugues in Ascending Key Order for Piano Solo *
Complete Music for Violin *, 112
The Complete Original Works of Anthony Newman on 20 CDs *
Concertino for Piano & Orchestra *
On Fallen Heros: Orchestral Works *
6 Concertos *, 1915, 2015
9 Sonatas for Piano Solo *, 1331, 
4 Symphonies *, 16851750, 2017
Complete Works for Piano *, 10964, 2015
Complete Chamber Works *, 1516
Angel Oratorio *
Complete Choral Works *, 2017
Three Commissioned Works ^ 3-2015, 2015
Lectures on Bach's Well Tempered Clavier, Books I and II, 1724, 2015
Anthony Newman Plays Vierne, Mozart, Stravinsky, Newman, Bach, and Couperin
Eugenia Zukerman and Anthony Newman play Bach, Haydn, and Hummel, 4143
New Music for Heard and Mind *, 713
Wedding Album, 170
Wedding Album, Great Music for a Great Occasion
Danielle Farina Plays Anthony Newman, 2013
Complete Works for Piano Four Hands, 10814, 2016
Great Works for the Organ Taken From Operas, 502
Celebratory Music for Harpsichord, 215
Albany Records
Absolute Joy, TROY 327, 1999
Bach 2000 A Musical Tribute, 357, 2000
Nicole and the Trial of the Century, 351, 20000
Air Force Strings Label
Newman: Concerto for Viola and Orchestra *
Arabesque Recordings
Newman's Valentine Songs, 2016
Great Christmas Music for the Organ, Z6881, 2015
Cambridge Records
Music by Anthony Newman *, CRS B 2833, 1978

CBS Masterworks/Columbia
Anthony Newman Harpsichord, M 30062,1968
Anthony Newman – JS Bach, MS 7421, 1969
Music for Organ, M 31127, 1969
Anthony Newman Plays and Conducts Bach and Haydn, MQ 32300, 1973
Anthony Newman Plays Harpsichord, Organ, and Pedal Harpsichord, M 32229, 1973
Anthony Newman Plays J.S. Bach on the Pedal Harpsichord and Organ, MS 7309, 1968
Bach: Goldberg Variations, M 30538, 1971
The Well Tempered Clavier Book I, M2 32500, 1973
The Well Tempered Clavier Book II, M2 32875, 1971
Bach: The Six Brandenburg Concertos, M2 31398, 1972
Lutheran Organ Mass, M2-32497, 1973
Bhajebochstiannanas *, M 32439, 1973
Organ Orgy, M 33268, 1975
J.S. Bach/Anthony Newman, MS 7421, 1970

Connoisseur/Arabesque
Brahms: The Two Cello Sonatas
Mozart: Sonata in D for Two Fortepianos, 8125

Delos Productions
Toning – Music for Healing and Energy *, DE 3213, 1997
Music for a Sunday Morning, DE 3173, 1995

Deutsche Grammophon
J.S. Bach: Arias, 429737, 1990

Digitech
Handel: Water Music, Music for the Royal Fireworks, DIGI 103, 1979

Epiphany Records
Concerts Royaux, EP-23, 2017

Essay
Martin: Concerto for Seven Wind Instruments, 1014, 1991

Excelsior Records
Masterpieces for Flute, 1982   
J.S. Bach: The Ultimate Organ Collection, EXL-2-5221, 1994

Helicon
Bach at Lejansk, HE1010, 1996
Bach In Celebration, 5107, 2000
Bach: The Goldberg Variations
Infinity Digital/Sony
Bach Favorite Organ Works, QK 62385, 1992
Bach: Goldberg Variations, QK 625882, 1996
Bach: Toccatas, 1996

Kelos
Bach: Great Works for Organ – Toccatas and Fugues, 2000

Khaeon
Bach: The Well Tempered Clavier, Book 1 (complete piano and harpsichord) Vol I, KWM6001031, 2001
Bach: The Well Tempered Clavier, Book 1 (complete piano and harpsichord) Vol II, KWM6001032, 2001
Bach: The Well Tempered Clavier, Book 1 (complete piano and harpsichord) Vol III, KWM6001033, 2001
Bach: The Great Works for the Organ
Requiem *, KWM600102

Musical Heritage Society
Telemann: Six “Konzerte” for Flute and Concertante Harpsichord, MHS 4523, 1982
Two Generations: Concerti for Guitar and Chamber Orchestra, MHS 7397A, 1986
Vivaldi Oboe Concerti, 513905X, 1993

Naxos
The Four Seasons, 2006

Newport Classic
Bach: Preludes and Fugues for Organ, Vol 1, NCD 60001, 1986
Bach: Preludes and Fugues for Organ, Vol 2, NCD 60002, 1986
Bach: Preludes and Fugues for Organ, Vol 3, NCD 60003, 1986
Bach: Preludes and Fugues for Organ, Vol 4, NC 60004, 1986
Bach: 6 Trio Sonatas, LC 8554, 1995
Bach: Favorite Works for Organ, NCD 60090, 1992
Bach Brandenburgs 
Beethoven: Four Great Sonatas (fortepiano), NCD 60040, 1988
Beethoven: Violin Sonatas, NCD 60097, 1990
Couperin: Two Organ Masses, NCD 60041, 1988
Falla: Harpsichord Concerto, NC 60017, 1986
Franck: Complete Works for the Organ, Vol I, NCD 60060, 1987
Franck: Complete Works for the Organ, Vol I, NCD 60061, 1987
J.S. Bach: Goldberg Variations, NCD 60024, 1987
Bach: St. John Passion, NC 60015/1, 1986
For God and Country, NCD 85533, 1994
Keyboard Companion, NCD60026, 1991
César Franck; Complete Organ Works, Vol I,  NCD060060, 1989
César Franck; Complete Organ Works, Vol II,  NCD060061, 1989
Mozart: 6 Fortepiano Sonatas, Vol I,  NCD 60121, 1990
Mozart: 4 Fortepiano Sonatas, Vol II,  NCD 60122, 1990
Mozart: 4 Fortepiano Sonatas, Vol III,  NCD 60123, 1990
Mozart: 4 Fortepiano Sonatas, Vol IV,  NCD 60124, 1990
W.A. Mozart: Seven Sonatas for Flute and Keyboard, NCD 60120, 1992
Mozart: Complete Music for String Orchestra, NCD 60137, 1990
Romantic Masterworks for Organ, Vol I, NCD 60060, 1989
Romantic Masterworks for Organ, Vol II, NCD 60050, 1989
Scarlatti Sonatas, NCD 60080, 1989
Solo Organ Concerti, NCD 60071, 1989
Beethoven: Piano Concerto No. 1 (fortepiano), NC 60031, 1987
Beethoven: Piano Concertos No. 2 and 4 (fortepiano), NCD 60081, 1988
Beethoven: Piano Concerto No. 3 (fortepiano), NC60007, 1986
Beethoven: Piano Concerto No. 5 (fortepiano), NC 60027, 1987
J.S. Bach: Concertos for One and Two Harpsichords, NC 60023, 1987
Schumann: Piano Concerto, NCD 60034
Beethoven: Violin Sonatas (fortepiano)
Lutheran Organ Mass, NCD 60073
On Fallen Heroes, Orchestral Works by Anthony Newman *, NCD 60140, 1992
A Christman Album, NCD 60072, 1989
Newman New Music *, NCD 60032, 1988
Time Pieces, NCD 6044
Contemporary American Piano Music, NCD 60048

OUR Recordings
Telemann: Complete Recorder Sonatas, 8226909, 2014

Peter Pan
Midnight in Havana, 4411, 1999

Sheffield
A Bach Organ Recital, S-6, 1966

Sine Qua Non 
Bach: Favorite Organ Music, SQN-7771, 1976
Bach: Organ Masterpieces, SA 2042, 1981
Bach: Harpsichord Collection, SQN-2050

Sonoma
Music for Organ, Brass, and Timpani, SAC-001, 2004

Sony
Handel: Harpsichord Suites, SBK 62834, 1997, 1992
Mozart: Famous Piano Sonatas, 63290, 1997
Scarlatti: Harpsichord Sonatas, SBK 62654, 1989, 1996
Baroque Duet, SK 46672, 1992
Grace, 62035, 1995
Saint-Saëns: Symphony No. 3, 'Organ', SK 53979, 1996
Bach: The Brandenburg Concertos, 62472, 1994
Classic Wynton, 60804, 1998
In Gabriel's Garden, 66244, 1996
Organ Orgy, 1974
Bach: Goldberg Variations, SICC 2107, 1972
Newman Plays Newman *, GS 9005, 1984
The Wedding Album, MDK 47273, 1991
Mozart: Eine Kleine Nachtmusik; Symphonies 35, 40, 41, 63272, 1997
Lease Breakers, 1985
Wynton Marsalis: The London Concert, 1995

Vox
Bach: The Twenty-Four Organ Preludes and Fugues, Vol I, SVBX 5479, 1976
Bach: The Twenty-Four Organ Preludes and Fugues, Vol II, SVBX 5480, 1976
Bach: Toccatas for Harpsichord, 7520, 1996
Famous Organ Works
Bach: Suite No. 2 in B minor; Telemann: Suite in A minor, DVCL 9017, 1986
Kodaly: Missa Brevis; Vaughan—Williams: Mass in G Minor, VCS 9076
Vivaldi: Six Sonatas for Cello and Harpsichord, VCL 9074

Vox Cum Laude
J.S. Bach Six Sonatas for Flute and Keyboard, VCL 9070, 1984
Bach: Well-Tempered Clavier, Book I, VCL 9056, 1983
Bach: The 3 Gamba Sonatas, D-VCL 9020, 1983
Jane's Hand: The Jane Auste Songbooks, VCL 7537, 1997

Vox Box
JS Bach: 24 Preludes and Fugues Vol, I, CDX 5013, 1995
JS Bach: 24 Preludes and Fugues, Vol. II, CDX 5100, 1995

MMG Vox Prima
The Heroic Mr. Handel, MWCD 7100, 1986

Turnabout Vox
Soler: 6 Concerti for 2 Keyboard Instruments, TV 341365, 1968
Bach Organ Works, QTV-S 34656, 1976
Organ Favorites for the Christmas Season, 34797, 
Bach at Madeira, 346656

Warner Classics
The Bach Family, 61-7505, 1984

Awards
1958 French Government Bourse Scholarship
1963 Variell Fellowship, Harvard University
1964 Winner, International Composition Competition (organ solo), Nice, France
1967 Fulbright Fellowship
1977 Harpsichordist of the Year, Keyboard magazine
1978 Harpsichordist of the Year, Keyboard magazine
1981 Classical Keyboardist of the Year, Keyboard magazine
1986 Beethoven's Third Piano Concerto chosen Record of the Year by Stereo Review
1993 Boston University Distinguished Graduate award
2004 Musica Sacra award
30 consecutive annual composer awards from The American Society of Composers, Authors and Publishers (ASCAP)

References

External links
 Anthony Newman, musician
 Anthony Newman: The High Priest of Bach is Still Controversial
 Biography
 Interview
 Biography
 A Newman For All Seasons
 Newman At Large
Interview with Anthony Newman by Bruce Duffie, October 20, 1989
At Peace with a Certain Level of Renown 2014

American classical organists
American male organists
Living people
1941 births
Musicians from Los Angeles
American male composers
20th-century American composers
American harpsichordists
American classical pianists
Male classical pianists
American male pianists
Mannes School of Music alumni
Harvard University alumni
Boston University College of Fine Arts alumni
Boston University faculty
École Normale de Musique de Paris alumni
Juilliard School faculty
Indiana University faculty
State University of New York at Purchase faculty
American Zen Buddhists
Converts to Buddhism
20th-century American pianists
Classical musicians from California
21st-century classical pianists
21st-century organists
20th-century American male musicians
21st-century American male musicians
21st-century American pianists
21st-century American keyboardists
Male classical organists